Tellervotrema is a genus of trematodes in the family Opecoelidae.

Species
Tellervotrema armstrongi Gibson & Bray, 1982
Tellervotrema beringi (Mamaev, 1965) Gibson & Bray, 1982
Tellervotrema katadara (Kuramochi, 2001) Kuramochi, 2009

References

Further reading
Blend, C., Kuramochi, T. & Dronen, N. (2015). Re-evaluation of Tellervotrema katadara (Kuramochi, 2001) Kuramochi, 2009 (Opecoelidae: Plagioporinae) and supplementary morphological data for T. beringi (Mamaev, 1965) Gibson & Bray, 1982 with new host and locality. Zootaxa, 3986(4), 435–451.

Opecoelidae
Plagiorchiida genera